Phase is the debut studio album by the English singer and songwriter Jack Garratt, released on 19 February 2016 by Island Records internationally and by Interscope Records in the United States. It debuted at number 3 on the UK Albums Chart on sales of 18,198.

Critical reception

At Metacritic, which assigns a normalized rating out of 100 to reviews from mainstream critics, the album received an average score of 64, based on 15 reviews.

Writing for Exclaim!, Paula Reid called Phase "a strong start to Garratt's career," praising his vocal and lyrical work.

Track listing

Personnel 

 Jack Garratt – vocals, all instruments, drum programming, production, mixing
 Mike Spencer – additional bass, guitars and keyboards 
 Carassius Gold – mixing 
 Brett Cox – mixing 
 Stuart Hawkes – mastering
 Zoë Zimmer – design, photography, art direction

Charts

References

2016 debut albums
Island Records albums
Jack Garratt albums